The Men's 62 kg competition at the 2017 World Weightlifting Championships was held on 29 November 2017.

Schedule

Medalists

Records

Results

References

External links
Results 

Men's 62 kg